Samad Vurgun (born Samad Yusif oghlu Vekilov; March 21, 1906 – May 27, 1956) was an Azerbaijani and Soviet poet, dramatist, public figure, first People's Artist of the Azerbaijan SSR (1943), academician of Azerbaijan National Academy of Sciences (1945), laureate of two Stalin Prizes of second degree (1941, 1942), and member of the Communist Party of the Soviet Union from 1940.

The Azerbaijan State Academic Russian Drama Theatre and streets in Baku and Moscow, and formerly the city of Hovk in Armenia, are named after him.

Samad Vurgun is the first poet in the literature history of Azerbaijan who was given the title “The Poet of Public”.

Biography
Samad Vurgun was born on March 21, 1906, in Salahly village of Kazakh Uyezd, at present Qazax District of Azerbaijan Republic. Samad's mother died when he was six years old and he was in the charge of his father and Ayshe khanim, his maternal grandmother. After graduating from school, his family moved to Qazax and Samad entered teacher's seminary of Qazax with his elder brother Mekhdikhan Vekilov (1902–1975). In 1922, their father and a year later their grandmother died and concern for the future poet and his brother passed to their cousin Khangizi Vekilova. He taught literature at village schools in Qazax, Ganja and Quba. He studied at Moscow State University for two years (1929–1930) and then continued his education at Azerbaijan Pedagogical Institute.

In 1945 the poet was elected the full member of the Academy of Sciences of Azerbaijan SSR. Furthermore, the republican Society of Cultural Relations with Iran was founded in Baku in that year and S.Vurghun was assigned as the Chairman of this society. The establishment of the spiritual bridge between Azerbaijan and Iran was achieved through the works of the poet.

Samad Vurghun was assigned the Vice President of Academy of Sciences of the Republic in 1953 in regard with the changes in the life of the country and Republic. He introduced important issues to the social sciences by discussing urgent problems and the project of scientific publication.

In October, 1955, the poet fell ill in his visit to Vietnam as a member of the soviet delegation. As a result, he was hospitalized in Beijing, China. He wrote short poems when he was at hospital. He returned to Azerbaijan after a few weeks but his health got worse.

In 1945, he was chosen a full member of the Academy of Sciences of Azerbaijan SSR and deputy of the Supreme Soviet of the Soviet Union of the 2nd and 4th convocations (1946–1956).

Samad Vurgun died on May 27, 1956, and was buried in Baku, in the Alley of Honor.

Works
His first work—a poem "Appeal to the youth"—was published in 1925, in "Yeni Fikir" (New Thought) newspaper in Tiflis. It was written as a graduation work from seminary. Samad Vurgun's poetical talent showed itself in the 1930-40s. His poetical collection of poems "Konul Defteri" (The Soul's Book) and the book "Sheirler" (Poems) were published in 1934. During these years, our Literature and Dramaturgy prospered when the poet created new works using foreign words. There was a significant progress in his works in 1935. At that time, the poet created 7 voluminous poems and about 100 poems written in 1934. His poem "Azerbaijan" is one of the pearls of Azerbaijan Literature. His works cover not only the ancient history of Azerbaijan, natural beauties and recourses but also hospitality of Azerbaijani nation.

The poet's first book—"Şairin andı" (Poet's oath)—was published in 1930. The Great Patriotic War was of the utmost importance in Samad Vurgun's life. More than 60 poems, including "Bakının dastanı" (Legend of Baku) were written during wartime. During these years Samad Vurgun's fame had increased. Leaflets with poem "To partisans of Ukraine" were thrown from planes to forests in Ukraine to support partisans.

Samad Vurgun's "Ananın öyüdü" poem (Farewell speech of mother) received the highest mark in the contest of the best antiwar poem in the US, in 1943. In New York, the poem was chosen as one of the 20 best poems in world literature with a war theme and distributed among soldiers. In the same year "House of Intellectuals named after Fuzuli" for holding events and meetings with fighting soldiers was opened on his initiative in Baku.

Collected verses
The Poet's Oath (1930)
The Lamp (1932)
The Parched Books (1947)

Poems
The Komsomol Poem (1933, unfinished)
Even (1932)
Muradkhan (1933)
Khumar (1933)
Lokbatan (1933)
Village morning (1933)
Death place (1934)
Bitter memories (1935)
26 (1935)
Gallows (1935)
Dead love (1935)
Rebellion (1936)
Basti (1936)
A Negro tells (1948)
Mugan (1949)
Reading Lenin (1950)
Aygun (1951)
The Standard Bearer of Century (1954)

Dramas
Vagif (1937)
The sun is rising (1938–1939)
Two Lovers (1940)
Farhad and Shirin (1941)
The Man (1945)

Plays
Vagif (1937). In this work Samad Vurgun described Molla Panah Vagif's tragic destiny.
Khanlar (1939). Dedicated to revolutionary Khanlar Safaraliyev's life.
Farhad and Shirin (1941). Poetica drama based on Nizami's "Khosrow and Shirin" poem's motifs.
Human (1945).

Translations
In 1936, Samad Vurgun translated A.S. Pushkin's "Eugene Onegin" poem into Azerbaijani and was conferred "A.S. Pushkin" Medal by the Committee of Pushkin.
In 1936, Samad Vurgun translated part of Shota Rustaveli's "The Knight in the Panther's Skin" poem and was conferred an honorary diploma of the Georgian SSR.
In 1939, Samad Vurgun translated Nizami's "Layla and Majnun" poem.
He also translated a lot of poems of Taras Shevchenko, Maxim Gorky, Ilia Chavchavadze and Zhambyl.

Awards
People's Poet of the Azerbaijan SSR (1956)
Stalin Prize of the second degree (1941) – for "Vagif" play
Stalin Prize of the second degree (1942) – for "Farhad and Shirin" play
Two Lenin Orders

Family
He was married to Khaver khanim Mirzabeyova and had three children:

Sons: Yusif Samadoglu – People's Writer of Azerbaijan and Vagif Samadoglu – National poet of Azerbaijan (2000) and recipient of Istiglal (Independence) Order (June 2014).

Daughter: Aybeniz Vekilova – Honored Culture Worker.

Poems dedicated to Samad Vurgun
"Speech of my friend Samad Vurgun at lunch in London" – Konstantin Simonov"To Samet Vurgun" – Nâzım Hikmet

Memory

In 1976, was released a post stamp of the USSR, dedicated to Samad Vurgun.
In 2006, was released a post stamp of Azerbaijan, dedicated to Samad Vurgun.
In Azerbaijan 70 streets, 7 libraries, 20 schools, 5 palaces of culture, 5 parks, 4 cinemas are named after Samad Vurgun. (Before the USSR collapse there were 38 collective farms) A street in Moscow (Russia), and Derbent (Dagestan); a library in Kyiv (Ukraine); school #257 in Dushanbe (Tajikistan); a technical school in Plovdiv (Bulgaria); Azerbaijan State Academic Russian Drama Theatre, and a township in Qazax are named after Samad Vurgun.

Notes

References

Sources
Great Soviet Encyclopedia, 3rd ed.

External links

 "You've Grown So Old" by Samad Vurgun. English translation by Peter Tempest (audio)
Verses (in Russian)
Гасан Гулиев. Самед Вургун. "Литературный Азербайджан"

1906 births
1956 deaths
20th-century Azerbaijani dramatists and playwrights
20th-century Azerbaijani poets
20th-century Azerbaijani writers
People from Qazax
Communist Party of the Soviet Union members
Second convocation members of the Supreme Soviet of the Soviet Union
Third convocation members of the Supreme Soviet of the Soviet Union
Fourth convocation members of the Supreme Soviet of the Soviet Union
Stalin Prize winners
Recipients of the Order of Lenin
Recipients of the Order of the Red Banner of Labour
Male poets
Pseudonymous writers
Socialist realism writers
Azerbaijani academics
Azerbaijani dramatists and playwrights
Azerbaijani communists
Azerbaijani male poets
Azerbaijani male writers
Soviet dramatists and playwrights
Soviet communists
Soviet male poets
Burials at Alley of Honor
Honored Art Workers of the Azerbaijan SSR